Winner Cup 2009 was the 4th edition of the Israeli basketball pre-season tournament Winner Cup. It was played between  October 4 and October 8 in Jerusalem at the Malha Arena, during the Jewish holiday of Sukkot. Hapoel Jerusalem has won the cup after defeating Maccabi Tel Aviv 86-80 in the final. MVP was Tre Simmons (Hapoel Jerusalem).

Tournament Bracket

The teams were seeded according to their last season standings.

External links
 Winner Cup

2009
Winner